François de Hérain (10 November 1877 – 28 May 1962) was a French painter, sculptor and engraver who had initially worked as a doctor.<ref>Atkin, Nicolas. Petain'". Routledge, 2014; </ref> He did many paintings of scenes in French Algeria and Morocco and authored several art books. He won the Prix Charles Blanc from the Académie française for Peintres et sculpteurs écrivains d’art'' in 1961. His wife, Eugénie Hardon, later married Marshal Philippe Pétain.

He lived in Paris and Les Baux de Provence, where a square, Place François de Hérain, was named in his honour.

References

1877 births
1962 deaths
19th-century French painters
20th-century French painters
20th-century French male artists
French male painters
19th-century French sculptors
20th-century French sculptors
19th-century French engravers
20th-century French engravers
19th-century French male artists